Wendy Appleby (born April 30, 1952) is an American former professional tennis player.

Appleby, a Los Angeles native, was active on the professional tour in the 1970s. She reached the mixed doubles quarter-finals of the 1971 Wimbledon Championships, as a qualifying pairing with Larry Collins.

Following her tennis career she served as a police officer in Oakland for 27 years.

References

External links
 

1952 births
Living people
American female tennis players
Tennis players from Los Angeles